The red sea catfish (Bagre pinnimaculatus), also called the long-barbeled sea catfish, is a species of sea catfish in the family Ariidae. It was described by Franz Steindachner in 1876, originally under the genus Aelurichthys. It inhabits tropical marine, brackish and freshwater in the eastern-central and southeastern Pacific regions, including Mexico, Colombia, Ecuador, Costa Rica, Guatemala, Honduras, El Salvador, Panama, Nicaragua, and Peru.

The diet of the red sea catfish at a recruitment age consists of the scales of bony fish. It is of important commercial value to fisheries, and has been consumed since the pre-Columbian era. It is sold fresh, dried, smoked, and salted, but is often labelled as other species including those in the family Sciaenidae, due to the higher market price.

Due to its wide distribution and abundancy in many areas in the eastern Pacific, as well as its lack of known threats or observed population decline, the IUCN Redlist currently rates the red sea catfish as least concern. It notes that the species' range includes a number of areas under marine protection.

References

red sea catfish
Fish of Mexican Pacific coast
Western Central American coastal fauna
Fish of Colombia
Fish of Ecuador
Fish of Peru
Freshwater fish of Mexico
Freshwater fish of Central America
Freshwater fish of South America
Freshwater fish of Colombia
Freshwater fish of Ecuador
Freshwater fish of Peru
red sea catfish